The 2016–17 Coupe de France preliminary rounds, Bretagne made up the qualifying competition to decide which teams from the Brittany leagues took part in the main competition from round 7. This was the 100th season of the most prestigious football cup competition of France. The competition was organised by the French Football Federation (FFF) and is open to all clubs in French football, as well as clubs from the overseas departments and territories (Guadeloupe, French Guiana, Martinique, Mayotte, New Caledonia (qualification via 2016 New Caledonia Cup), Tahiti (qualification via 2016 Tahiti Cup), Réunion, and Saint Martin).

The qualifying rounds took place between August and October 2016.

First round

First round (Bretagne)

Second round
These matches were played on 28 August 2016.

Second round results: Bretagne

Third round
These matches were played on 10 and 11 September 2016.

Third round results: Bretagne

Fourth round
These matches were played on 24 and 25 September 2016.

Fourth round results: Bretagne

Fifth round
These matches were played on 8 and 9 October 2016.

Fifth round results: Bretagne

References

Preliminary rounds